On 22 November 1938, Mikhail Botvinnik (playing white) defeated José Raúl Capablanca (playing black) in one of the most famous games in chess history. The game was played in round 11 of the AVRO tournament in Rotterdam. Capablanca was a former World Chess Champion (1921-27), while Botvinnik would later become World Champion himself (1948-57).

The game was widely praised, including by Garry Kasparov who said: [...] Botvinnik played what was altogether the "game of his life" against Capablanca. It was not just that it was judged the most brilliant in the tournament and to be worth two first prizes, but it was even suggested that, by analogy with the "immortal" and "evergreen" games, it should be called "peerless" or "classical"!

This was the last game between the two before Capablanca's death in 1942; he was suffering poor health during the tournament. Botvinnik and Capablanca had previously played seven other games of competitive tournament chess, including another game with the opposite colours at the same tournament a few days prior, which was drawn. In 1925, Botvinnik (then aged 14) had beaten Capablanca in an exhibition simultaneous game.

The game 
White: Mikhail Botvinnik  Black: José Capablanca  Tournament: AVRO, Netherlands 1938  Opening: Nimzo-Indian Defense (ECO E49)

1. d4 Nf6 2. c4 e6 3. Nc3 Bb4 4. e3 d5 5. a3 Bxc3+ 6. bxc3
White gets doubled pawns but they quickly get undoubled.

6... c5 7. cxd5 exd5 8. Bd3 0-0 9. Ne2 b6 10. 0-0 Ba6 11. Bxa6 Nxa6 12. Bb2 Qd7 13. a4 Rfe8 14. Qd3 c4
After the game, Botvinnik suggested 14...Qb7 as an alternative here.

15. Qc2 Nb8 16. Rae1 Nc6 17. Ng3 Na5 18. f3
White prepares to make use of his central  in order to gain , and, later on, to attack Black's king. Black's knight moves to an outpost on the b3-square, but it proves unable to defend against White's advances.

18... Nb3 19. e4 Qxa4 20. e5 Nd7 21. Qf2 g6 22. f4 f5 23. exf6 e.p. Nxf6 24. f5 Rxe1 25. Rxe1 Re8? 26. Re6 Rxe6 27. fxe6 Kg7 28. Qf4 Qe8 29. Qe5? Qe7? (see diagram)

According to Graham Burgess, Black's best try was 29...h6 30.h4! (30.Ne2 might draw) 30...Na5! 31.Bc1! Qe7 32.Bg5! with winning chances for White; however, the move played leads to a tactical combination that wins instantly.

30. Ba3
White draws Black's queen away from blockading the passed pawn.

30... Qxa3
Black has no choice because otherwise White's passed pawn advances (31.e7).

31. Nh5+!
This sacrifice of the knight must be accepted because of the fork of Black's knight and king. Black's knight cannot take White's, however, due to the pin on it by White's queen. White regains the knight by a queen fork next move.

31... gxh5 32. Qg5+ Kf8 33. Qxf6+ Kg8 34. e7 Qc1+ 35. Kf2 Qc2+ 36. Kg3 Qd3+ 37. Kh4 Qe4+ 38. Kxh5 Qe2+ 39. Kh4 Qe4+ 40. g4 Qe1+ 41. Kh5 
Black is out of useful checks and is faced with the threat of mate with Qf8. If 41...h6, then White promotes the pawn after 42.Qg6+ Kh8 43.e8=Q+, mating after 43...Qxe8 44.Qxe8+ Kg7 45.Qe7+ followed by 46.Kxh6 and 47.Qg7#.

 
Black resigned.

See also 
List of chess games
Passed pawn

Notes

References

External links 
 Game score with annotations at Chessgames.com
 Analysis of the game (YouTube)

Chess games
1938 in chess
November 1938 sports events